"After All" is a song co-written and recorded by American country music artist Ed Bruce.  It was released in October 1983 as the third and final single from his album You're Not Leavin' Here Tonight. The song reached number 4 on the Billboard Hot Country Singles chart.  Bruce wrote the song with his wife Patsy.

Chart performance

References

1983 singles
Ed Bruce songs
Songs written by Ed Bruce
Song recordings produced by Tommy West (producer)
MCA Records singles
1983 songs
Songs written by Patsy Bruce